Haywood Hall, also known as the Treasurer John Haywood House, is a historic home located at Raleigh, Wake County, North Carolina.  It was built in 1792, and is a two-story, five bay, Federal-style frame dwelling with a central hall plan.  It features a two-story front porch with attenuated fluted Doric order columns. It was the home of North Carolina State Treasurer John Haywood (1754-1827). It is now open as a historic house museum.

It was listed on the National Register of Historic Places in 1970.  It is located in the Capitol Area Historic District.

References

External links

 Haywood Hall - official site

Historic American Buildings Survey in North Carolina
Houses on the National Register of Historic Places in North Carolina
Federal architecture in North Carolina
Houses completed in 1792
Houses in Raleigh, North Carolina
Haywood family residences
National Register of Historic Places in Raleigh, North Carolina
Historic district contributing properties in North Carolina
Museums in Raleigh, North Carolina
Historic house museums in North Carolina